"Love Is Just a Game" is a song written and recorded by American country music artist Larry Gatlin.  It was released in September 1977 as the third single and title track from the album Love Is Just a Game.  The song reached number 3 on the Billboard Hot Country Singles & Tracks chart.

Chart performance

References

1977 singles
1977 songs
Larry Gatlin songs
Monument Records singles
Songs written by Larry Gatlin